Hill City is an unincorporated community in Gordon County, in the U.S. state of Georgia.

History
Variant names were "Blue Spring", "Blue Springs", and "Miller". The present name is after the hilly terrain of the area. A post office called Blue Spring was established in 1870, the name was changed to Hill City in 1909, and the post office closed in 1956.

References

Unincorporated communities in Gordon County, Georgia